PTTI may stand for:

Postal, Telegraph and Telephone International, a former global union federation
Precise Time and Time Interval, a standard for highly accurate timing